Janaina Tschäpe (born 1973) is a Brazilian and German artist.

Biography 
Janaina Tschäpe was born in 1973 in Munich, Germany, and was raised in São Paulo, Brazil. She received her Bachelor in Fine Arts from the Hochschule für Bildende Kueste, Hamburg in 1997 and her Master in Fine Arts from the School of Visual Arts in 1998. Tschäpe’s interdisciplinary practice spans painting, drawing, photography, video and sculpture. Incorporating elements of aquatic, plant, and human life, Tschäpe’s universe of sublime forms shift between representation, fantasy and abstraction. 

The artist lives and works in New York since 1997.

Her work is in the Guggenheim Museum, New York,  the Mudam, Luxembourg, the National Museum of Women in the Arts and the Taguchi Fine Art Collection, Japan.

Bibliography 
 ARANTES, Priscila; BARROS, Lenora; LESCHER, Artur. Enciclopédia Temporada de Projetos: 1997–2009. São Paulo: Paço das Artes, 2010.
 Art Now! Vol. 4, Hans Werner Holzwarth (editor), Cologne: Taschen, 2013

References

External links 
 Official site

21st-century German women artists
German women painters
German women sculptors
German video artists
1973 births
Living people
Women video artists
21st-century German painters
21st-century German sculptors
Artists from Munich
School of Visual Arts alumni